Willy Leow (25 January 1887 – 3 October 1937) was a German communist politician and activist.

Life and work
Willy Leow attended elementary school in Brandenburg an der Havel. Then he learned the carpentry trade and was taught at the Workers' Educational School in Berlin. In January 1904 Leow became a member of the German Wood Workers Association. In the same year Leow joined the Social Democratic Party (SPD), to which he belonged to 1916. After Leow had participated in 1917 in the foundation of the Spartacus League and briefly belonged to the Independent Social Democratic Party of Germany  (USPD), he was in the end of 1918 a founding member of the Communist Party of Germany (KPD).

1925 Leow was elected the Second Chairman of the Roter Frontkämpferbund (RFB), founded in 1924, the defense and protection organization of the KPD. Leow was often seen marching alongside other prominent KPD and RFB activists such as Ernst Thälmann. 1928 Leow was elected to the Reichstag, where he remained until 1933. Later SPD politician Herbert Wehner, who was himself a communist in the Weimar period wrote decades later in his memoirs, Leow was "a thoroughly corrupt person".

After the Nazi seizure of power Leow fled abroad. From 1935 he lived in the Soviet Union. He worked as an editor and head of the German state publishing house in the Volga German Autonomous Soviet Socialist Republic. In 1936, he was arrested during the Stalinist purges and sentenced to death on 3 October 1937 for organizing a Trotskyist-terrorist group in the Military Collegium of the Supreme Court of the USSR, and was shot.

Post mortem
In the history of the German Democratic Republic Leow was in the first decades after his death a so-called Damnatio Memoriae; he was deliberately concealed in the history of the GDR and in the public culture of remembrance of the East German state: His person was deliberately not mentioned and traces of his existence have been systematically eliminated from published documents and image reproductions of the GDR. Leow was retouched out of a widely printed photograph  which showed him next to Ernst Thälmann during a RFB march in the 1920s. The reason for this practice was that the arrest and murder of Leow (a German communist and refugee from fascism) by the Soviet sister state did not fit into the historical picture of the GDR, and therefore his publications were not allowed to be distributed.

References

Literature 

 Leow, Willy. Bundesstifung Aufarbeitung Berlin

Members of the Reichstag of the Weimar Republic
German communists
Independent Social Democratic Party politicians
Rotfrontkämpferbund members
Great Purge victims from Germany
1887 births
1937 deaths